The Women's FIH Hockey World League was an international women's field hockey competition organised by the International Hockey Federation. The league also served as a  qualifier for the 2014 and 2018 Women's Hockey World Cups and the 2016 Olympic Games.  Three seasons were held in 2012–13, 2014–15 and 2016–17. It was replaced by the new Women's FIH Pro League and Hockey Series in 2018-19.

Format
The tournament featured four rounds. For each edition the FIH decided the number of events and teams for each round. The number of Round 1 events varied in each cycle depending on the number of participating national teams. Teams were grouped regionally, although European teams were split in several tournaments. The remaining rounds have teams selected with no regional restrictions. The top teams received a bye to a Round 2 or Semifinal event depending on the FIH World Rankings at the time of seeking entries, number which also varied depending on the edition.

Summaries

Performance by nation

* = host nation

Team appearances

* = host nation
~ = includes results representing Great Britain

References

External links

 

 
Defunct women's international field hockey competitions
Recurring sporting events established in 2012
Recurring sporting events disestablished in 2017